Minori (originally Rheginna Minor) is a comune in the province of Salerno, in the Campania region of south-western Italy. As a part of the Amalfi Coast, it was declared a UNESCO World Heritage Site in 1997. 

An ancient seaside resort of Roman high society, as evidenced by the discovery of a patrician villa dating back to the 1st century, it has today evolved into a popular tourist destination for its natural landscapes and its culinary tradition. For the latter reason it is also nicknamed "City of Taste" (Città del gusto) or "Eden of the Amalfi Coast" (Eden della Costiera amalfitana).

Etymology

The origin of the name, Minori (meaning 'small'), comes from its association with the river flowing through it, namely La Rheginna. The ancient Latin name for the town was indeed Rheginna Minor, and the neighboring town of Maiori – meaning 'large' – was once known as Rheginna Maior because of the same association.
Eventually, the names of both towns were abbreviated, Rheginna Minor turning into Minori.

History
As shown by archaeological research, Minori was the oldest inhabited site on the Amalfi Coast. Below the flat area of the present urban center is a two-floor maritime Roman villa (of which only the lower part is preserved), dating back to the 1st century AD, and decorated with frescoes and mosaics. The villa, likely belonging to an exponent of the senatorial or equestrian patriciate, was active throughout the Julio-Claudian age until the 4th century AD. It was later abandoned and, therefore, inexorably covered by heaps of lava material erupted from Mount Vesuvius, eventually precipitating downstream due to heavy torrential rains.

According to an ancient local tradition, the first inhabited nucleus of Minori had developed in the northeastern hilly area of Forcella, which was abandoned at the time of the miraculous discovery of the body of Saint Trofimena on the underlying shores, in the 7th century.

Throughout the Middle Ages, the history of Minori closely followed that of neighboring Amalfi. The whole Amalfi Coast was indeed one of the many areas of southern Italy under Byzantine influence. The town was originally included in the autonomous Duchy of Naples (not directly subjected to the Eastern Roman Empire), extending along the coastal strip of Campania up to lower Lazio. Following the Lombard raids of the 9th century, the Amalfi Coast formed an autonomous duchy, firstly ruled by elected magistrates, but shortly later by hereditary ducal dynasties.

The urban structure of Minori underwent various transformations in the Modern Age, at the time of the Spanish viceroyalty. Sea defenses were strengthened in the 16th century in order to resist incursions of Barbary pirates, whereas places of worship were considerably diminished. This period turned to be somewhat negative for Minori and its inhabitants, as the town was plagued by a profound economic crisis, due to political and administrative uncertainty as well as multiple natural disasters (mainly because of storm surges).
In 1799, in the context of the French and Neapolitan revolutionary movements, Minori was "municipalized and democratized" by the bourgeoisie and the local clergy. However, after the Congress of Vienna, the town returned under Spanish domination, within the newly formed Kingdom of the Two Sicilies. Begun in 1811 and completed in 1852, a new and more practical road was built to break the centuries-old isolation in which the people of the Amalfi Coast were forced to live.
In 1860, like the rest of southern Italy, Minori was conquered by Giuseppe Garibaldi and his troops in the process of Italian unification advanced by the House of Savoy.

In September 1943, after Armistice with which Italy exited from the alliance with Nazi Germany in World War II, Minori was one of the locations involved in the so-called "Salerno landing", thanks to which the Allied forces entered the Tyrrhenian coast of the Italian peninsula in order to advance toward Rome.

Main sights

Basilica di Santa Trofimena
Saint Trofimena is venerated by the Roman Catholic Church as a young Sicilian martyr. She is known by several names, and may possibly be related to a myth about the siren Parthenope. According to a popular legend, at a very early age she had been killed by her father for refusing to marry a pagan, and was crammed into an urn, thrown into the sea. The urn was dragged by the marine currents until it washed onto the beach at Minori. The people who found it used small white heifers to carry it to the place where locals would later build a temple in her honor.

Roman Maritime Archeological Villa
Most likely built in the first century BC at sea level. One of the best preserved elements of the villa is its large hall with tunnel vaults, stucco, and remains of frescos.

Saint Nicola Convent
Positioned halfway between Minori and Maiori, this religious site might date back to the end of the 11th century or the beginning of the 12th century.

Airport
The nearest airport is Salerno-Pontecagnano Airport (QSR), although the vast majority of visitors land at (and depart from) Naples International Airport (NAP).

See also 
Amalfi Coast
Roman Catholic Diocese of Minori
Sorrentine Peninsula
Province of Salerno
Campania

References

External links

Cities and towns in Campania
Amalfi Coast
Coastal towns in Campania